Cherry (also Cherry Ford) is an unincorporated community in Wirt County, West Virginia, United States.  Its elevation is 679 feet (207 m).

References

Unincorporated communities in Wirt County, West Virginia
Unincorporated communities in West Virginia